William John Dick (16 July 1889 – 18 November 1960) was an Australian rules footballer who played for  and  in the Victorian Football League (VFL).

Career

Dick made his debut for the Carlton Football Club in round 6 of the 1911 season. He left the club at the end of the 1918 season. His nephews Ian and Alexander Dick played first-class cricket for Western Australia, with Ian also captaining Australia at field hockey in the 1956 Summer Olympics in Melbourne.

External links

 Billy Dick at Blueseum

1889 births
Carlton Football Club players
Carlton Football Club Premiership players
Fitzroy Football Club players
Brighton Football Club players
Brunswick Football Club players
Australian rules footballers from Victoria (Australia)
1960 deaths
People from Stawell, Victoria
One-time VFL/AFL Premiership players